Ceroglossus magellanicus is a species of beetle in the family Carabidae. Eighteen subspecies are currently recognized.

References

Carabinae